George C. "Stormy" Hogreiver (March 17, 1869 – January 26, 1961) was an outfielder in Major League Baseball. He played for the Cincinnati Reds and Milwaukee Brewers. His baseball career ended after a shoulder injury in 1912.

References

External links

1869 births
1961 deaths
Major League Baseball outfielders
Cincinnati Reds players
Milwaukee Brewers (1901) players
Baseball players from Cincinnati
Sportspeople from Appleton, Wisconsin
Minor league baseball managers
Kansas City Blues (baseball) players
St. Paul Saints (Western League) players
Oshkosh Indians players
Easton Dutchmen players
Birmingham Grays players
Birmingham Blues players
Sioux City Cornhuskers players
Indianapolis Hoosiers (minor league) players
Indianapolis Indians players
Des Moines Underwriters players
Pueblo Indians players
Lincoln Railsplitters players
Appleton Papermakers players
Major League Baseball umpires
19th-century baseball players
Hamilton (minor league baseball) players